Akbar, officially the Municipality of Akbar (Tausūg: Lupah Akbar; Chavacano: Municipalidad de Akbar), is a  municipality in the province of Basilan, Philippines. According to the 2020 census, it has a population of 23,098 people.

History
Akbar was created through Muslim Mindanao Autonomy Act No. 193 dated December 20, 2005.

It is composed of 9 barangays that were formerly part of Tuburan, including one island barangay.

The place is named after Imam Akbar Marani, a known Islamic preacher/propagator and descendant of Kuddarat, who landed in Taguime (now part of the municipality of Moh’d Ajul) in 17th century and later migrated to central Mindanao. In his older age, Imam Akbar transferred from Sinangkapan, Akbar, to Lantawan based in Kanibungan and he was buried there.

Geography

Barangays

Akbar is politically subdivided into 9 barangays.

Climate

Demographics

In the 2020 census, Akbar had a population of 23,098.

Economy

References

External links
Akbar Profile at the DTI Cities and Municipalities Competitive Index
[ Philippine Standard Geographic Code]

Municipalities of Basilan